Friedrich Lux (24 November 1820 – 9 July 1895) was a German conductor and composer. He was born in the town of Ruhla and was initially an organist. Lux was a student of Friedrich Schneider. Between 1841 and 1850, he was Director of the Opera in Dessau and from 1851-1857 performed the same role in Mainz.

Notable works
 In 1882, he composed the opera Der Schmied von Ruhla, with a libretto by Ludwig C. Bauer.
 In 1884, he composed the comic opera The Duchess of Athens, with a libretto by Wilhelm Jacoby.

References

Bibliography
 Short, Michael. Liszt Letters in the Library of Congress. Pendragon Press, 2003.

External links
 

1820 births
1895 deaths
People from Ruhla
19th-century German composers